Woodchipper Massacre is a 1988 American horror comedy Z movie directed by Jon McBride, who also directed Cannibal Campout The film was also written by McBride. and was filmed in Connecticut.

Plot

Jon (Jon McBride), Denice (Denice Edeal), and Tom (Tom Casiello) are three kids whose father goes away for a business meeting. He leaves them in care of their Aunt Tess (Patricia McBride) who is a militaristic religious extremist who only lets the kids do homework and chores while preaching to them against dating, staying up late, movies, music, and why their lifestyle is wrong. Tom gets an official Rambo Hunting Knife in the mail and Tess will not let him have it. They get into a physical struggle over Tom keeping it, and Aunt Tess accidentally gets fatally stabbed in the stomach.

The three kids then dismember her body, placing it in the freezer. They then take her body out of the freezer so they can put her in the woodchipper. They grind her body to shreds. They then think it's over. But then, Tess's son, Kim (Kim Baily), who was recently released from prison, comes to their home and is told that his mother is "not here" and has "left." He is involved in some kind of money wiring deal and came there to get money from his mother. He decides to take monetary value from the children's home and threatens them if they don't give it to him. Denice and Tom trick him out to the "expensive" woodchipper, plotting to throw him inside, too. They lure Kim to look inside. Tom turns it on and Kim is pushed in by Jon.

Jon drives Kim's car to the airport to hide the evidence and hitches a ride back. Denice and Tom are raking and mowing the lawn which Jon promised his father he would have done by the time he returned from the business meeting. With only a little bit of time before their father's return, Jon assists in the raking and mowing. The father then arrives home and sees his children welcoming him on the driveway. All appears normal, and the children get away with the crime.

The camera pans back to the woodchips on the ground and Aunt Tess's bloody ring is lying on the ground when the film ends.

Cast

 Jon McBride as Jon
 Denice Edeal as Denice
 Tom Casiello as Tom
 Patricia McBride as Aunt Tess
 Kim Bailey as Kim
 Perren Page as Father

Budget
According to an interview with Jon McBride on the DVD, the film's final budget was $400 (not including the cost of the camera).

Crew

Jon McBride acted, wrote, directed, edited, and composed Woodchipper Massacre. The film took 2 months to completely shoot. It was finished in 1988.

Release

DVD

The DVD for Woodchipper Massacre was released in early 2007. The VHS was released in 1990.

Reception
Woodchipper Massacre currently has no Rotten Tomatoes approval rating, but has a Want-To-See score of 100%.

References

External links

American comedy horror films
1988 films
Camcorder films
1980s comedy horror films
1988 horror films
Films about murder
1988 comedy films
1980s American films